Penghulu (also Pěnghulu) is the headman or chief of a region in traditional  societies on the Malay archipelago in Maritime Southeast Asia. The term is currently used in Brunei and Malaysia as the community leader of the smaller country subdivision or settlement.

Etymology
The word penghulu comes from agentive prefix peng-, and the word hulu, meaning "head", so it could be translated as "headman". It is cognate with the Tagalog pangulo – the official title of the President of the Philippines.

History 
Traditionally, the Minangkabau who at the end of the 17th century settled at Negeri Sembilan, in present-day Malaysia, chose from among themselves a penghulu. Several of these penghulus, notably that of Sungai Ujong, Jelebu, Johol and Rembau, became powerful enough to dominate other penghulus. By the early part of the 18th century, the leaders of these four districts started calling themselves Undang.

Between 1821 and 1838 (the Padri War), many Penghulus had allied themselves with Dutch interests in fighting off Wahabite-inspired, Islamic extremism in the area. The situations in Brunei were similar with what was happened in current Indonesia and Malaysia. Office of the Penghulu for ruling executive government in mukim level was created by British administrators to help British colonial government collecting tax from Brunei citizens. Until the reign of Omar Ali Saifuddien III, those given peerage titles, usually, will be reign in particular mukims decided by King of Brunei.

Current usage

Brunei 

In Brunei, penghulu is an administrative post and is the community leader of a mukim or subdistrict, the second-level administrative division below district which consists of several towns or locally known as kampong (village). Until 2015, Appointment of penghulu decided by District Office after receiving recommendations from members of Mukim Consultative Council. After 2015, appointment of penghulus are conducted through local elections by each of the mukims citizen upon reaching 18 years old and more.

Philippines 
In the Philippines, the cognate 'Pangulo' is the Filipino word for 'President', thus presidents of the Philippines are often called pangulo.

See also
Adat

References

Titles of national or ethnic leadership
Minangkabau people
Yang di-Pertuan Besar of Negeri Sembilan